"BaShana HaBa'a" ("Next Year") is a 1970 Israeli song with music by Nurit Hirsch and lyrics by Ehud Manor. The song was first performed by the duo Ilan & Ilanit.

The same melody was arranged and sung by Iranian singer Aref as "Kochooloo (Kuchulu)", and by Turkish singer Nilüfer as "Başıma gelenler".  Julius Wechter and the Baja Marimba Band covered the song on their 1971 album Julius Wechter and the Baja Marimba Band's Back under the title "Anytime of the Year (Bashana Haba'ah)".

External links

References

Israeli songs